JSC Tactical Missiles Corporation (KTRV) (КТРВ) is a major Russian holding company for the manufacturers of weapon (especially missiles), headquartered in Korolyov, Moscow Oblast.

History 
Tactical Missiles Corporation was founded on the basis of Zvezda-Strela by the Decree of Russian President №84, signed on January 24, 2002.

Zvezda-Strela was a major designer and producer of military missile systems, and included the Zvezda Experimental Design Bureau (OKB), a serial production design bureau (SKB), the main Strela plant, and machine building plants in Kostroma and Bendery Moldova. It was formerly part of the missile-industry grouping Spetstekhnika (Special Equipment).

The structure of Tactical Missiles Corporation was expanded by subsequent decrees №591 on May 9, 2004 and №930 on July 20, 2007.

Sanctions 
Sanctioned by New Zealand in relation to the 2022 Russian invasion of Ukraine.

Structure 
Structure of the holding:
 Vympel NPO
 MKB Raduga
 Region SSPE
 NPO Mashinostroyeniya
 PO Strela
 PZ Mashinostroitel
 NPO Electromechanics
 Avangard
 UNIIKM
 Smolensk Aviation Plant
 Taganrog Krasny Gidropress Plant
 IBC Iskra
 PJSC Salute
 Turayevo ICD Soyuz
 Ural Design Bureau Detail
 Central Design Bureau of Automation
 ANPP TEMP AIR
 Azov optical-mechanical plant
 Research Institute of Machine Building
 RCH Globe
 SIC ASK
 Trading House Star - Boom
 711 Aircraft Repair Plant
 Gidropribor
 Plant Motor
 Verhneufaleysky Uralelement
 Research Institute of Maritime Thermal Technology
 Dagdizel Plant
 Electrodraught

Missiles
 Kh-23 (AS-7 "Kerry")
 Kh-25 (AS-10 "Karen")
 Kh-27 (AS-12 "Kegler")
 Kh-29 (AS-14 "Kedge")
 Kh-31 (AS-17 "Krypton")
 Kh-35 (AS-20 "Kayak")
 Kh-38
 Kh-59
   Kh-69
 R-77
 R-27
 R-73
 R-33
R-37
 LMUR (Izdelie 305)

Torpedoes
 APR-3M
 VA-111 Shkval supercavitating torpedo

Guided bombs
 UPAB 1500

References

External links

  
  

 
Defence companies of Russia
Companies established in 2002
Companies based in Moscow Oblast
2002 establishments in Russia
Guided missile manufacturers
Holding companies of Russia
Government-owned companies of Russia
Russian entities subject to the U.S. Department of the Treasury sanctions